Lodderia coatsiana is a species of sea snail, a marine gastropod mollusk in the family Skeneidae.

Description
The height of the shell attains 2.25 mm. This is a small, solid, white shell with a deep umbilicus, elegantly sculptured. It contains 4 whorls, with two apical sleek, white whorls. The two others are aequicostate with smooth, thickened, subflexuous ribs. The penultimate whorl is very flat. The last whorl has four spiral keels, with a blunt keel below the sutures, two at the periphery. The aperture is round.

Distribution
This marine species occurs in the Magellanic Strait off Argentina at a depth of about 100 m.

References

 Engl W. (2012) Shells of Antarctica. Hackenheim: Conchbooks. 402 pp.

coatsiana
Gastropods described in 1912